Radek Štěpánek was the defending champion, but he lost in the final to Andy Roddick, 7–6(7–2), 7–6(9–7).

Seeds

Draw

Finals

Top half

Bottom half

Qualifying
The top six seeds received byes into the second round.

Seeds

Qualifiers

Draw

First qualifier

Second qualifier

Third qualifier

Fourth qualifier

External links
Main Draw
Qualifying Draw

Brisbane International - Singles
Singles